Wilfredo Guzman (born 23 February 1951) is a Puerto Rican boxer. He competed in the men's light middleweight event at the 1976 Summer Olympics. At the 1976 Summer Olympics, he defeated Brian Byrne of Ireland, before losing to Jerzy Rybicki of Poland.

References

1951 births
Living people
Puerto Rican male boxers
Olympic boxers of Puerto Rico
Boxers at the 1976 Summer Olympics
Place of birth missing (living people)
Light-middleweight boxers
20th-century Puerto Rican people